Frank Robert Burns (March 16, 1928 – July 14, 2012) was an American football player and coach.  He served as the head coach at Johns Hopkins University from 1951 to 1952 and at Rutgers University from 1973 to 1983, compiling a career college football record of 84–52–2.  In 1978, Burns led the Rutgers Scarlet Knights to their first bowl game, the now-defunct Garden State Bowl.

Playing career
Raised in Roselle Park, New Jersey, Burns played baseball, basketball and football at Roselle Park High School, serving as captain of the football and basketball teams, and winning state championships in both of those sports.

Burns played football as a quarterback at Rutgers University for four years, from 1945 to 1948.  There he ran the T formation under head coach Harvey Harman, completing 117 of 270 passes for 2,389 yards and 35 touchdowns with a 27–7 career record.  He was also a member of Delta Upsilon fraternity.

Coaching career
Burns coached football at Johns Hopkins University from 1951 to 1952 and at Rutgers University from 1973 to 1983.  Burns has the most wins of any head coach in Rutgers Scarlet Knights football history with a record of 78–43–1 including an undefeated 11–0 campaign in 1976. He led Rutgers to a 13–7 upset victory over Tennessee in 1979.

During Burns's tenure as head coach, Rutgers began playing outside of its traditional schedule of Eastern teams such as Ivy League opponents, Colgate, and Lehigh.  Burns was dismissed from Rutgers in 1983 after three consecutive losing seasons.

Later life and death
Burns retired to the Twining Village Continual Care Retirement Village in Holland, Pennsylvania.  He died there on July 14, 2012.

Head coaching record

College

References

1928 births
2012 deaths
American football quarterbacks
Johns Hopkins Blue Jays football coaches
Rutgers Scarlet Knights baseball players
Rutgers Scarlet Knights football coaches
Rutgers Scarlet Knights football players
High school football coaches in New Jersey
People from Roselle Park, New Jersey
Players of American football from New Jersey
Sportspeople from Union County, New Jersey